Koreh Soni Rural District is in the Central District of Salmas County, West Azerbaijan province, Iran. At the National Census of 2006, its population was 19,951 in 3,892 households. There were 22,300 inhabitants in 5,463 households at the following census of 2011. At the most recent census of 2016, the population of the rural district was 22,234 in 5,713 households. The largest of its 26 villages was Silab, with 4,505 people.

References 

Salmas County

Rural Districts of West Azerbaijan Province

Populated places in West Azerbaijan Province

Populated places in Salmas County